Mortu Nega (English: Death Denied or Those Whom Death Refused) is a 1988 historic film by Flora Gomes, a director from Guinea-Bissau. Mortu Nega was Gomes' first feature-length film and the first film produced in independent Guinea-Bissau. It was also the first the first ethnofiction film to show the experiences of the Guinea-Bissau War of Independence, blending contemporary history with mythology. Its world premiere was at the Venice Film Festival on August 29, 1988.

Synopsis
1973: Diminga accompanies a group of camouflaged soldiers who travel down a path, in the middle of the shrubland, carrying supplies to a war front near Conakry, where Diminga's husband Sako is fighting. The country is ruined and there is death everywhere, but hope is what keeps life worth living. In the encampment where she meets Sako, Diminga does not have much time to enjoy his company. The rebels are gaining ground and they are certain that they will command victory.

1974–77: The end of the war, but not truly an end. There is a great drought across the country and life continues to be difficult. It is true that where Diminga lives, in between the crying, there are great celebrations for the end of the war. But the drought continues, Diminga has a sick husband and other fighting (mostly over rations) starts.

The film, in the words of its director, is an African parable. The colonies won their independence and eliminated Portuguese colonialism. A question that arises is about Africa's future. As Flora Gomes suggests, Africa cannot be itself without its beliefs, its myths, its philosophy, and its culture.

Interpretation
The year the film premiered, 1988 "not only marks the 25th anniversary of the independence of Guinea-Bissau and the assassination of its leader Amílcar Cabral, it is also the year in which the country was practically annihilated by a brutal civil war” (Teresa Ribeiro, a journalist for Voice of America). The film is an “elegy, not for the victims of the war of liberation, but for its survivors."

Mortu Nega has become a cult film seen as having “no ideologies or morals. It is a love story: nervous, carnal, sensitive” (René Marx, Pariscope, March 14, 1990).

Cast
 Bia Gomes as Diminga
 Tunu Eugenio Almada as Sako
 Mamadu Uri Balde as Sanabaio
 M'Make Nhasse as Lebeth
 Sinho Pedro DaSilva as Estin
 Homma Nalete as Mandembo
 Caio Leucadio Almeida as Onkono
 Brinsam as Irene Lopes
 Abi Cassama as Nurse
 Ernesto Moreira as Doctor
 Flora Gomes as Head of Sector

Technical information

 Script – Flora Gomes, Manuel Rambault Barcellos, and David Lang
 Production – National Film Institute of Guinea-Bissau
 Producers – Cecília Fonseca, Odette Rosa, Nina Neves Aimée and Jacques Zajdermann
 Photography – Dominique Gentil
 Editing – Christiane Lack
 Format – 35 mm film
 Genre – historical docufiction, ethnofiction
 Duration – 92 minutes
 Distribution – California Newsreel

Festivals and Shows

 1988 – Venice Film Festival, August 29 (2 Honorable Mentions)
 1989 – Panafrican Film and Television Festival of Ouagadougou (FESPACO), March
 1989 – Cannes Film Festival, May 16
 1989 – Belgian Cinedecouvertes, July
 1989 – London Film Festival – November 16–20
 1990 – Seattle International Film Festival – May 28
 1990 – Journées Cinématographiques de Carthage (French), Tunis, October – November (bronze Tanit award)
 1997 – 9th Annual Cascade Festival of African Films, February 20
 2000 – New York Film Center, June 20
 2000 – African Film Festival, November 26
 2003 – Flora Gomes Retrospective and African Film Festival at Brown University

See also
 Docufiction
 List of docufiction films

 Cinema of Portugal
 African Cinema

References

External links
 Mortu Nega (1988) – IMDb page about Mortu Nega
 Mortu Nega – California Newsreel
 Mortu Nega – Film.com page about Mortu Nega
 Mortu Nega (1988) – refusing to give up – Overview/review of the film
 Mortu Nega/Death Denied – Portland Community College course page about Mortu Nega.
 Mortu Nega – Brown University, Department of African Studies
 L'Afrique Subsaharienne et la Mondialisation – article by Catherine Maya (French)
 

Bissau-Guinean films
1988 films
Ethnofiction films
Films set in the 1970s
Films set in Guinea
Films set in Guinea-Bissau